Zbigniew Woźnicki (21 June 1958 – 26 February 2008) was a Polish cyclist. He competed in the individual and team pursuit events at the 1980 Summer Olympics.

References

External links
 

1958 births
2008 deaths
Polish male cyclists
Olympic cyclists of Poland
Cyclists at the 1980 Summer Olympics
People from Grodzisk Mazowiecki County
Sportspeople from Masovian Voivodeship